Bashnouna (died 19 May 1164) was a Coptic saint and martyr.

According to his hagiography, Bashnouna was a monk in the Monastery of Saint Macarius the Great in Scetes. He was arrested by the Fatimid authorities during the caliphate of Al-'Āḍid, and threatened to face death if he were not to convert to Islam. Having refused, Bashnouna was burned alive on 24 Pashons, 880  (19 May 1164 AD) His relics were buried at the Church of Saint Sergius in Cairo.

References

Sources
Coptic Synexarion

12th-century Christian saints
Coptic Orthodox saints
Christians executed for refusing to convert to Islam
1164 deaths
Egyptian Christian monks
12th-century Christian martyrs
Christian saints killed by Muslims
Year of birth unknown